Rodeløkka Depot was a tram depot located in Verksgaten at Rodeløkka in Oslo, Norway.


History
The depot was built for Kristiania Kommunale Sporveie in 1899. It was taken out of use when Kristiania Sporveisselskab took over the operation of the Rodeløkka Line in 1905.  The tin shed was disassembled in the 1930s, and is now used as boat storing house at the summer resort place of Oslotrikken's employees at Herøya in Tyrifjorden.  It is one of the oldest tram depots in Oslo that are preserved.

Facilities
The depot was a small red tin shed with place for six cars, built on municipally owned ground.

References

Oslo Tramway depots